List of the cemeteries in Hudson County, New Jersey

Hudson County is home to many churches and cemeteries, some of which provide significant open areas in otherwise congested residential areas.

History
There are some shared characteristics of cemeteries in North Bergen. In the Annual report of the National Board of Health in 1879 four cemeteries, historically Grove Church, Hoboken, Machpelah, and Weehawken, all lie on the western side of the Hudson Palisades which gives them similar soil deposits and somewhat uniquely, the presence of trap rock on the grounds. Their locations allow for good water drainage into the nearby Secaucus marshes with minimal contamination due to the steep grade of the hills. They were created in roughly the same time period. Two of the four cemeteries were split up, and now make a total of six unique cemeteries in the area; these cemeteries are all contained within a roughly one mile stretch of parallel roads Tonnelle Avenue and Kennedy Boulevard, constituting a string of green open spaces in North Hudson. In Jersey City, four cemeteries, namely Saint Peters', Holy Name, Jersey City, and New York Bay all provide the surrounding areas with long vistas and green open spaces as well. Finally, several burial grounds exist in Hudson County, some of which date back into colonial times are lost and possibly removed or built over.

Another characteristic of many cemeteries in Hudson County is that they host a large amount of civil war veteran graves.

List

See also

Edgewater Cemetery
Fairview Cemetery (Fairview, New Jersey)
Mount Moriah Cemetery (Fairview, New Jersey)

References

Sources

 
Cemeteries in Hudson County, New Jersey
Hudson County, New Jersey